BKFC may refer to:

 Balestier Khalsa FC, a Singaporean professional football club
 Bam Khatoon F.C., an Iranian women's football club based in Bam
 Bangkok F.C., a professional Thai football club from Bangkok, Thailand
 Bare Knuckle Fighting Championship, an American bare-knuckle boxing promotion based in Philadelphia